Elizabeth Beardsley Butler (1884–1911) was a pioneering social investigator of the Progressive Era. She is best known for her contributions to The Pittsburgh Survey, a landmark study of social conditions in an American city.

Life
She was born in New York on 1 December 1884.

A 1905 graduate of Barnard College, she also took courses at the New York School of Philanthropy before securing employment as a researcher of wage earners, both female and child, in Jersey City, New Jersey, Pittsburgh, and Baltimore. Beginning in 1907 she worked for Paul Kellogg's Pittsburgh Survey, funded by the Russell Sage Foundation. Her resulting book, Women and the Trades, was published in 1909. It was the first large survey of wage-earning women in America and the first of the six volumes of the Survey.

Butler died of tuberculosis at age 26 in Saranac Lake, New York.

Her final book, Saleswomen in Mercantile Stores: Baltimore, 1909, was posthumously published by the Russell Sage Foundation in 1912.

References

1880s births
1911 deaths
American social sciences writers
Barnard College alumni
Columbia University School of Social Work alumni
20th-century deaths from tuberculosis
Tuberculosis deaths in New York (state)